Rijan (also Romanized as Rījān; also known as Rekhan and Reyḩān) is a village in Beyza Rural District, Beyza District, Sepidan County, Fars Province, Iran. At the 2006 census, its population was 277, in 62 families.

References 

Populated places in Beyza County